Albert "Alby" Talipeau (born 15 August 1981) is a rugby league footballer who plays as a  or  for the Eastern Suburbs Tigers in the Queensland Cup competition.

Playing career
Talipeau has previously played for Cronulla De La Salle; in the National Rugby League for the Sydney Roosters; in the Queensland Cup for the Wynnum Manly Seagulls; and in the Super League for the Wakefield Trinity Wildcats.

Talipeau was awarded Man of the Match in the 2008 Queensland Cup Grand Final, when playing for the Souths Logan Magpies.

Representative career
Talipeau is a Samoan international and played at the 2000 Rugby League World Cup.

He played in the 2008 Rugby League World Cup, and has been named in the squad for the 2009 Pacific Cup.

On 2 May 2015 he played for Niue in a match against South Africa.

References

External links
The Teams: Samoa
Souths Logans Magpies profile

1981 births
Australian sportspeople of Samoan descent
Eastern Suburbs Tigers players
Living people
Niue national rugby league team players
Rugby articles needing expert attention
Rugby league halfbacks
Rugby league hookers
Samoa national rugby league team players
Samoan rugby league players
Souths Logan Magpies players
Sydney Roosters players
Wakefield Trinity players
Wynnum Manly Seagulls players